The 1991 World Table Tennis Championships men's singles was the 41st edition of the men's singles championship. 

Jörgen Persson defeated Jan-Ove Waldner in the final, winning three sets to nil to secure the title.

Results

See also
List of World Table Tennis Championships medalists

References

-